The Methodist Newsletter is a newsletter produced by the Methodist Church in Ireland every month except August. It is available by post for from every Methodist Church throughout Ireland. Published in Belfast by the Methodist Publishing Company (Ireland), the editor is Rev. Peter Mercer.

References

External links
 

Methodist Church in Ireland
Newspapers published in Ireland